Martina Müller-Skibbe (born 11 October 1982) is a former professional tennis player from Germany. She won one singles title and one doubles title on the WTA  tour.

Career
Coached by her father, Reinhard Müller, Martina had her best success on clay courts: she won her only WTA Tour singles title at the Budapest Grand Prix and one WTA Tour doubles title in 's-Hertogenbosch. On the ITF Women's Circuit, she won ten singles and ten doubles titles in her career. On 2 April 2007, she reached a career-high WTA ranking of world No. 33. In February 2008, she peaked at No. 47 in the doubles rankings.

In 2007, she started the year with middling results, reaching the second round at the Australian Open, losing to Elena Dementieva in three sets. From January to April, Müller never came past the second round of a tournament. In May, at the Qatar German Open in Berlin, she defeated Eleni Daniilidou and 13th seed Shahar Pe'er to reach the round of 16 where she lost to Svetlana Kuznetsova 3–6, 2–6. She reached the second round of Roland Garros, losing to Dominika Cibulková, and the second round at Wimbledon, retiring against Agnieszka Radwańska. In the previous round, Müller double-bageled Anna Smashnova. She reached the final at the Internazionali Femminili di Palermo before being defeated by Hungarian Ágnes Szávay in two sets.

Müller married longtime boyfriend Florian Skibbe in August 2011 and subsequently announced her retirement.

WTA career finals

Singles: 2 (1–1)

Doubles: 5 (1–4)

ITF Circuit finals

Singles: 17 (10–7)

Doubles (10–7)

References

External links
 
 
 
 Martina Müller the official website of Martina Müller

1982 births
Living people
Sportspeople from Hanover
German female tennis players
Tennis people from Lower Saxony